= Red Pineapple (apple) =

Apple cultivar

Red Pineapple is a German apple cultivar which is widely used in Denmark (Danish: Rød Ananas).

Sonneruplund recommends this apple variety for private gardens, as it can be grown without the use of pesticides.
